The men's 105 kilograms event at the 1998 Asian Games took place on 13 December 1998 at Thunder Dome, Maung Thong Thani Sports Complex.

Results 
Legend
NM — No mark

References
 Results

External links
 Weightlifting Database

Weightlifting at the 1998 Asian Games